Edkham Shukriyevich Akbulatov (born 18 June 1960) is a Russian politician who had been the Mayor of Krasnoyarsk from 2012 to 2017. He is of Volga Tatar origin and is a Sunni Muslim.

From 19 January until 17 February 2010 he served as acting governor of Krasnoyarsk Krai after serving First Deputy Governor to Alexander Khloponin and head of the government of Krasnoyarsk Krai in 2008-10, and deputy governor of Krasnoyarsk Krai and the chief of the Krai Economy and Planning Department in 2002-2008.

References

1960 births
Living people
Volga Tatar people
Tatar politicians
Politicians  from Krasnoyarsk
Mayors of Krasnoyarsk
Governors of Krasnoyarsk Krai
Russian Presidential Academy of National Economy and Public Administration alumni